All Saints’ Church, Dalbury is a Grade II* listed parish church in the Church of England in Dalbury Lees, Derbyshire.

History
The church dates from the 13th century. It was restored in 1844 with a contribution from the Queen Dowager, Adelaide of Saxe-Meiningen of £20 and reopened on 23 December 1844.

Organ
The organ dates from around 1820 and is by Benjamin Flight and Joseph Robson. A specification of the organ can be found on the National Pipe Organ Register.

Parish status
The church is in a joint parish with 
St John the Baptist's Church, Boylestone
St Michael and All Angels' Church, Church Broughton
St Chad's Church, Longford
Christ Church, Long Lane
St Andrew's Church, Radbourne
St Michael's Church, Sutton-on-the-Hill
All Saints’ Church, Trusley

See also
Grade II* listed buildings in South Derbyshire
Listed buildings in Dalbury Lees

References

Church of England church buildings in Derbyshire
Grade II* listed churches in Derbyshire